Vladlen Igorevich Babayev (born 16 October 1996) is a Russian football player. He plays for FC KamAZ Naberezhnye Chelny.

Club career
He made his debut in the Russian Football National League for FC Volgar Astrakhan on 15 July 2017 in a game against FC Rotor Volgograd.

References

External links
 Profile by Russian Football National League

1996 births
Sportspeople from Volgograd
Living people
Russian footballers
Association football midfielders
Russia youth international footballers
FC Spartak Moscow players
FC Volgar Astrakhan players
FC Metallurg Lipetsk players
FC Chayka Peschanokopskoye players
FC Akron Tolyatti players
FC KAMAZ Naberezhnye Chelny players
Russian First League players
Russian Second League players